Nymphon is a genus of sea spiders in the family Nymphonidae. The species of sea spiders within the genus Nymphon are all benthic organisms and are found in abyssal and bathyal areas of the ocean. This is a fully marine group and can be found at various depths ranging from the littoral zones to the deep sea. They are found in most major oceans across the globe with a strong distribution around polar regions: Arctic and Antarctic waters. Out of the sea spider genus, Nymphon is the most rich, with a majority of the species within the genis being found in the Southern Ocean region. This genus may also contain bioluminescent species.

Distribution 
Sea spiders in general are found all around the globe. The Nymphon genus has been commonly found in waters of higher latitudes and is associated with polar regions and having a more circumpolar distribution than other genus of sea spider. They are extremely abundant within polar regions, with Nymphon having the most species found in polar waters. In relation to the benthos, mainly inhabit marine fauna and are often found around sessile communities.

Feeding 
Generally, it is thought that Nymphon feed on hydroids, actinians, bryozoans, molluscs, annelids, crustaceans, and detritus. They have strong associations with corals and algae. However, feeding behavior in relation to coral and algae has not been observed and there is no current evidence of finding coral or algae material in their gut.

Species

 Nymphon aculeatum Child, 1994
 Nymphon adami  Giltay, 1937
 Nymphon adareanum  Hodgson, 1907
 Nymphon adenense  Muller, 1989
 Nymphon adenopus  Stock, 1991
 Nymphon aemulum  Stock, 1975
 Nymphon aequidigitatum  Haswell, 1885
 Nymphon akanei  Nakamura & Child, 1983
 Nymphon akanthochoeros  Bamber & Thurston, 1995
 Nymphon albatrossi  Hedgpeth, 1949
 Nymphon aldabrense  Child, 1988
 Nymphon andamanense  Calman, 1923
 Nymphon andriashevi  Pushkin, 1993
 Nymphon angolense  Gordon, 1932
 Nymphon apertum  Turpaeva, 2004
 Nymphon apheles  Child, 1979
 Nymphon apicatum  Stock, 1991
 Nymphon arabicum  Calman, 1938
 Nymphon arcuatum  Child, 1995
 Nymphon aritai  Nakamura & Child, 1991
 Nymphon articulare  Hodgson, 1908
 Nymphon australe  Hodgson, 1902
 Nymphon banzare  Gordon, 1944
 Nymphon barnardi  Arnaud & Child, 1988
 Nymphon basispinosum  Hilton, 1942
 Nymphon benthos  Hedgpeth, 1949
 Nymphon bergi  Losina-Losinsky, 1961
 Nymphon biarticulatum  (Hodgson, 1907)
 Nymphon bicornum  Arnaud & Child, 1988
 Nymphon biformidens  Stock, 1974
 Nymphon bigibbulare  Losina-Losinsky, 1961
 Nymphon biserratum  Losina-Losinsky, 1961
 Nymphon boogoora  Bamber, 2008
 Nymphon boraborae  Muller, 1990
 Nymphon bouvieri  Gordon, 1932
 Nymphon brachyrhynchum  Hoek, 1881
 Nymphon braschnikowi  Schimkewitsch, 1906
 Nymphon brevicaudatum  Miers, 1875
 Nymphon brevirostre Hodge, 1863
 Nymphon brevis  Nakamura & Child, 1991
 Nymphon brevitarse  Krøyer, 1838
 Nymphon bucuspidum  Child, 1995
 Nymphon bullatum Stock, 1992
 Nymphon bunyipi  Clark, 1963
 Nymphon caementarum Stock, 1975
 Nymphon caldarium  Stock, 1987
 Nymphon calypso  Fage, 1959
 Nymphon centrum  Child, 1997
 Nymphon chaetochir  Utinomi, 1971
 Nymphon chainae  Child, 1982
 Nymphon charcoti  Bouvier, 1911
 Nymphon citerium  Nakamura & Child, 1991
 Nymphon clarencei  Gordon, 1932
 Nymphon cognatum  Loman, 1928
 Nymphon comes  Flynn, 1928
 Nymphon compactum  Hoek, 1881
 Nymphon conirostrum  Stock, 1973
 Nymphon crenatiunguis  Barnard, 1946
 Nymphon crosnieri  Stock, 1965
 Nymphon curvidens  Stock, 1990
 Nymphon dentiferum  Child, 1997
 Nymphon diabolum  Child, 1988
 Nymphon discorsicoxae  Child, 1982
 Nymphon dissimilis  Hedgpeth, 1949
 Nymphon distensum  Möbius, 1902
 Nymphon draconum  Child, 1990
 Nymphon dubitabile  Stock, 1973
 Nymphon duospinum  Hilton, 1942
 Nymphon elegans  Hansen, 1887
 Nymphon elongatum  Hilton, 1942
 Nymphon eltaninae  Child, 1995
 Nymphon enteonum  Child, 2002
 Nymphon falcatum  Utinomi, 1955
 Nymphon femorale  Fage, 1956
 Nymphon filatovae  Turpaeva, 1993
 Nymphon floridanum  Hedgpeth, 1948
 Nymphon forceps  Nakamura & Child, 1991
 Nymphon foresti  Fage, 1953
 Nymphon forticulum  Child, 1995
 Nymphon fortunatum  Stock, 1997
 Nymphon foxi  Calman, 1927
 Nymphon frigidum  Hodgson, 1907
 Nymphon galatheae  Fage, 1956
 Nymphon gerlachei  Giltay, 1935
 Nymphon giltayi  Hedgpeth, 1948
 Nymphon giraffa  Loman, 1908
 Nymphon glabrum  Child, 1995
 Nymphon gracile Leach, 1814
 Nymphon gracilipes  Miers, 1875
 Nymphon granulatum  Arnaud & Child, 1988
 Nymphon grossipes  (Fabricius, 1780)
 Nymphon grus  Stock, 1991
 Nymphon gruveli  Bouvier, 1910
 Nymphon gruzovi  Pushkin, 1993
 Nymphon gunteri  Hedgpeth, 1949
 Nymphon hadale  Child, 1982
 Nymphon hamatum  Hoek, 1881
 Nymphon hampsoni  Child, 1982
 Nymphon hedgpethi  Stock, 1953
 Nymphon helleri  Bohm, 1879
 Nymphon heterodenticulatum  Hedgpeth, 1941
 Nymphon heterodentum  Turpaeva, 1991
 Nymphon heterospinum  Hedgpeth, 1949
 Nymphon hiemale  Hodgson, 1907
 Nymphon hirsutum  Child, 1995
 Nymphon hirtipes  Bell, 1853
 Nymphon hirtum (Fabricius, 1780)
 Nymphon hodgsoni  Schimkewitsch, 1913
 Nymphon immane  Stock, 1954
 Nymphon improcerum  Nakamura & Child, 1991
 Nymphon inaequipes  Stock, 1992
 Nymphon inerme  Fage, 1956
 Nymphon inferum  Child, 1995
 Nymphon infundibulum  Nakamura & Child, 1991
 Nymphon inornatum  Child, 1995
 Nymphon isaenki  Pushkin, 1993
 Nymphon japonicum  Ortmann, 1891
 Nymphon kensleyi  Child, 1988
 Nymphon kodanii  Hedgpeth, 1949
 Nymphon kurilense  Losina-Losinsky, 1961
 Nymphon kurilocompactum  Turpaeva, 2004
 Nymphon kurilokamchaticum Turpaeva, 1971
 Nymphon lanare  Hodgson, 1907
 Nymphon laneum  Turpaeva, 2006
 Nymphon laterospinum  Stock, 1963
 Nymphon leptocheles Sars, 1888
 Nymphon lituus  Child, 1979
 Nymphon lobatum  Stock, 1962
 Nymphon lomani  Gordon, 1944
 Nymphon longicaudatum  Carpenter, 1904
 Nymphon longicollum  Hoek, 1881
 Nymphon longicoxa  Hoek, 1881
 Nymphon longimanum  Sars, 1888
 Nymphon longispinum  Nakamura & Child, 1991
 Nymphon longitarse  Krøyer, 1844
 Nymphon longituberculatum  Olsen, 1913
 Nymphon macabou  Muller, 1990
 Nymphon macilentum  Stock, 1981
 Nymphon macquariensis  Child, 1995
 Nymphon macrochelatum  Pushkin, 1993
 Nymphon macronyx  Sars, 1877
 Nymphon macrum  Wilson, 1880
 Nymphon maculatum  Carpenter, 1910
 Nymphon maldivense  Clark, 1961
 Nymphon maoriana  Clark, 1958
 Nymphon maruyamai  Nakamura & Child, 1991
 Nymphon mauritanicum  Fage, 1942
 Nymphon megacheles  Child, 1988
 Nymphon megalops  Sars, 1877
 Nymphon mendosum  (Hodgson, 1907)
 Nymphon microctenatum  Barnard, 1946
 Nymphon microgracilipes  Pushkin, 1993
 Nymphon micronesicum  Child, 1982
 Nymphon micronyx  Sars, 1888
 Nymphon micropedes  Hedgpeth, 1949
 Nymphon microrhynchum  G.O. Sars, 1888
 Nymphon microsetosum  Hilton, 1942
 Nymphon modestum  Stock, 1959
 Nymphon molleri  Clark, 1963
 Nymphon molum  Hilton, 1942
 Nymphon monothrix  Child, 1995
 Nymphon multidens  Gordon, 1932
 Nymphon multituberculatum  Gordon, 1944
 Nymphon nagannuense  Takahashi, Kajihara & Mawatari, 2012
 Nymphon nakamurai  Stock, 1994
 Nymphon natalense  Flynn, 1928
 Nymphon neelovi  Pushkin, 1993
 Nymphon neumayri  Gordon, 1932
 Nymphon nipponense  Hedgpeth, 1949
 Nymphon novaecaledoniae Stock, 1991
 Nymphon novaehollandiae  Clark, 1963
 Nymphon nugax  Stock, 1966
 Nymphon obesum  Arnaud & Child, 1988
 Nymphon ochoticum  Losina-Losinsky, 1961
 Nymphon ohshimai  Hedgpeth, 1949
 Nymphon okudai  Nakamura & Child, 1991
 Nymphon orcadense  (Hodgson, 1908)
 Nymphon ortmanni  Helfer, 1938
 Nymphon pagophilum  Child, 1995
 Nymphon paralobatum  Arnaud & Child, 1988
 Nymphon parasiticum  Merton, 1906
 Nymphon parum  Stock, 1991
 Nymphon paucidens  Gordon, 1932
 Nymphon paucituberculatum  Gordon, 1944
 Nymphon pedunculatum  Arnaud & Child, 1988
 Nymphon perlucidum  Hoek, P.P.C., 1881
 Nymphon petri  Turpaeva, 1993
 Nymphon pfefferi  Loman, 1923
 Nymphon phasmatodes  Bohm, 1879
 Nymphon pilosum  Möbius, 1902
 Nymphon pixellae  Scott, 1912
 Nymphon plectrum  Takahashi, Kajihara & Mawatari, 2012
 Nymphon pleodon  Stock, 1962
 Nymphon polyglia  Bamber, 2004
 Nymphon premordicum  Child, 1995
 Nymphon primacoxa  Stock, 1968
 Nymphon proceroides  Bouvier, 1913
 Nymphon procerum  Hoek, 1881
 Nymphon profundum  Hilton, 1942
 Nymphon prolatum  Fage, 1942
 Nymphon proximum  Calman, 1915
 Nymphon pseudogracilipes  Pushkin, 1993
 Nymphon puellula Krapp, 1973
 Nymphon pumillum  Nakamura & Child, 1991
 Nymphon punctum  Child, 1995
 Nymphon quadriclavus  Nakamura & Child, 1991
 Nymphon residuum  Stock, 1971
 Nymphon rottnesti  Child, 1975
 Nymphon rybakovi  Pushkin, 1993
 Nymphon sabellum  Child, 1995
 Nymphon sandersi  Child, 1982
 Nymphon sarsii  Meinert, 1899
 Nymphon schimkewitschi  Losina-Losinsky, 1929
 Nymphon schmidti  Losina-Losinsky, 1961
 Nymphon scotiae  Stock, 1981
 Nymphon serratidentatum  Arnaud & Child, 1988
 Nymphon serratum  G. O. Sars, 1879
 Nymphon setimanus  Barnard, 1946
 Nymphon setipedes  Child, 1988
 Nymphon signatum  Möbius, 1902
 Nymphon simulare  Child, C.A., 1992
 Nymphon simulatum  Nakamura & Child, 1991
 Nymphon singulare  Stock, 1954
 Nymphon sluiteri  Hoek, 1901
 Nymphon soyoi  Utinomi, 1955
 Nymphon spinifex  Stock, 1997
 Nymphon spiniventris  Stock, 1953
 Nymphon stenocheir  Norman, 1908
 Nymphon stipulum  Child, 1990
 Nymphon stocki  Utinomi, 1955
 Nymphon striatum  Losina-Losinsky, 1929
 Nymphon stroemi  Krøyer, 1844
 Nymphon subtile  Loman, 1923
 Nymphon surinamense  Stock, 1975
 Nymphon tanypalpes  Child, 1988
 Nymphon tenellum  (Sars, 1888)
 Nymphon tenuimanum  Hodgson, 1915
 Nymphon tenuipes  Bouvier, 1911
 Nymphon torulum  Child, 1998
 Nymphon tricuspidatum Soler-Membrives & Munilla, 2011
 Nymphon tripectinatum  Turpaeva, 1971
 Nymphon trispinum  Child, 1998
 Nymphon trituberculum  Child, 1995
 Nymphon tuberculare  Losina-Losinsky, 1961
 Nymphon tubiferum  Stock, 1978
 Nymphon typhlops  Hodgson, 1915
 Nymphon uncatum  Child, 1998
 Nymphon unguiculatum  Hodgson, 1915
 Nymphon uniunguiculatum  Losina-Losinsky, 1933
 Nymphon vacans  Child, 1997
 Nymphon villosum  Hodgson, 1907
 Nymphon vulcanellum  Stock, 1992
 Nymphon vulsum  Stock, 1986
 Nymphon walvisense  Stock, 1981
 Nymphon zundianum  Pushkin, 1993

References 

Pycnogonids
Dubiously bioluminescent organisms